Fideo is a village in northwestern Syria, administratively part of the Latakia Governorate, located east of Latakia. Nearby localities include Baksa and Sqoubin to the north, Hanadi and al-Bassah to the west, Bustan al-Basha to the south. According to the Syria Central Bureau of Statistics, Fideo had a population of 4,065 in the 2004 census. Its inhabitants are predominantly Alawites.

References

Populated places in Latakia District
Alawite communities in Syria